Tan Bin Shen (born 24 January 1984) is a former badminton player from Malaysia. He assigned as Malaysia men's doubles national team coach in December 2020.

Personal life 
In his early years, Tan favoured chess and music. Tan began to play badminton at the age of 7. At the age of 12, Tan's potential was  spotted by a Selangor coach, Moo Chien Keat. The coach asked Tan's father if he could take him as a student. After receiving the nod from his father, the coach began to train Tan. Four years later, due to his great achievements, Tan was then drafted into the national squad. Tan is married with Melissa Lee, a law graduate from Northumbria University in United Kingdom. In Year 2012 & 2016, both of them welcome a baby boy and a baby girl. Maxwell Tan Guan Liang, Maxine Tan Guan En.

Career 
Tan Bin Shen played at the 2007 BWF World Championships in men's doubles with Ong Soon Hock. They were seeded world #16. He was the winner at the 2009 Australia Open Grand Prix and previously training with Gan Teik Chai under the coaching of Razif Sidek from Malaysia.

Achievements

Asian Championships 
Men's doubles

World Junior Championships 
Boys' doubles

BWF Grand Prix 
The BWF Grand Prix had two levels, the BWF Grand Prix and Grand Prix Gold. It was a series of badminton tournaments sanctioned by the Badminton World Federation (BWF) which was held from 2007 to 2017.

Men's doubles

  BWF Grand Prix Gold tournament
  BWF Grand Prix tournament

BWF International Challenge/Series 
Men's doubles

  BWF International Challenge tournament
  BWF International Series tournament
  BWF Future Series tournament

References

External links 
 

1984 births
Living people
People from Selangor
Malaysian sportspeople of Chinese descent
Malaysian male badminton players
Badminton coaches